Orit Ishay (Hebrew: אורית ישי; born 1961) is an Israeli artist working in photography, video and installation. She is also a lecturer in photography. Ishay's art examines the interrelation between man and place and possible systems of representation, while addressing questions pertaining to social and mental issues through temporal and spatial motifs. Her work is usually accompanied by theoretical research.

Biography 
Ishay was born in 1961 in Tel Aviv-Yafo. During 1983–1986, she studied art at Ha'Midrasha School of Art, Beit Berl College. After her graduation, she studied and worked in the field of interior design. In 2000–2003, she was a freelance photographer for prominent Israeli magazines (including Royim Olam, Nisha and Masa Acher-Voyage). In 2003, Ishay resumed her art studies and attended the Photography Department of Musrara School of Photography, Media and New Music in Jerusalem, from which she graduated with honors in 2006. She then continued to specialize in the B.Ed. in Art program at The David Yellin Academic College, Jerusalem, which she completed with honors in 2007.

During her second year of photography studies in Jerusalem, Ishay was invited to participate in museal exhibitions in Cracow, Poland. and in St. Petersburg, Russia. She has since exhibited in Israel and around the world. After her graduation from the Musrara School, she won the America-Israel Cultural Foundation Award (2007–08, 2006–07). Although Ishay did not meet the award's age criteria, the committee justified its decision by referring to the quality and originality of the works.

In 2010–2012, Ishay studied in the postgraduate Fine Art Program at Ha'Midrasha School of Art, Beit Berl College, which she completed with honors. While attending the program she conducted a project in collaboration with essayist Oded Wolkstein, which culminated in the book The House. The book, published by Ha'Kibbutz HaMeuchad – Sifriat Poalim in 2014, features original artworks by sixteen contemporary artists who responded to the poem "The House" by the poet Avoth Yeshurun. During her studies in the program, Ishay was awarded creative scholarships for projects at the Cabri Print Workshop (2011) and the Jerusalem Print Workshop (2012).

Towards the end of 2014, Ishay will engage in a project at the MuseumsQuartier Wien, in the framework of an invitation to an extended residency program at quartier21 supported by Eikon, an international photography and media art magazine, following her 2010 exhibition at the FotoGalerie Wien in Vienna.

Over the years, Ishay has presented several solo exhibitions as well as had her works featured in group exhibitions at prominent art venues in Israel and abroad; among them are The Israel Museum Jerusalem, Tel Aviv Museum of Art, Museum of Contemporary Art in Bucharest, Romania and The Derby Museum of Art in the UK. In addition to her activity in the confines of the traditional white cube, Ishay also operates in the public space. In 2009, in protest against the selection of the participating artists, she performed a guerrilla action in which she placed a 3 meter high Styrofoam sculpture in the shape of the Oscars statue in the plaza of the Tel Aviv Art Biennial. In 2012, she led a tour that was open to the general public in the "Haifa Walks #2" project, held in the framework of the show Haifa-Jerusalem-Tel Aviv at the Haifa Museum of Art.

Ishay works are present in a number of public, private and institutional collections such as The Israel Museum Jerusalem; Ashdod Museum of Art; CCA Tel Aviv Video Archive; Bank Ha'poalim; America-Israel Cultural Foundation and in further collections both in Israel and abroad.

Awards 
 2014: MuseumsQuartier Wien, quartier21 Artist-in-Residence Studio Program, Vienna
 2012: Jerusalem Print Workshop, a scholarship for a yearly new project & exhibition
 2011: The Gottesman Etching Center, Kibbutz Cabri
 2009: The Yehoshua Rabinovich Foundation for the Arts Tel Aviv
 2007: America-Israel Cultural Foundation, Keren Sharett
 2006: America-Israel Cultural Foundation, Keren Sharett

Solo exhibitions
 2014: Terribly Pretty, Awfully Beautiful. The Kibbutz Gallery Tel Aviv, IL
 2014: Way 2 Way, Dwek Gallery, Mishkenot Sha'ananim, Jerusalem
 2013: Fire Zone, Tichonet Gallery, Tel Aviv, IL
 2012: 1917 (as a part of Attributes exhibition) MoBY – Museum of Contemporary Art Bat Yam, IL 
 2011: Lucky Numbers, The Kaye Gallery for the Arts, Kaye College, Be’er Sheva
 2010: Lucky Numbers, The Gallery in Kibbutz Bee’ri  
 2010: Public Domain – Seven Boom, Solution and Evolution, Tina B, Prague Contemporary Art Festival, Czech
 2009: Public Domain, TheHeder Contemporary Art Gallery, Tel Aviv 
 2008: Fire Zone, The Gallery in Kibbutz Nachshon, IL
 2008: Blocked, The Morel Derfler Gallery, Jerusalem
 2007: Regarding Pilgrims, The Anna Akhmatova Museum, St. Petersburg
 2006: Regarding Pilgrims, Galicia Jewish Museum, Kraków

Selected group exhibitions 
 2014: Rising Star, Herzliya Museum of Contemporary Art, IL
 2014: Re-Imagining Jerusalem – A Dialogue with Beit Avi Chai Photography Collection, Jerusalem
 2014: Secular Judaism, Nahum Gutman Museum of Art, Tel Aviv
 2014: Disturbed Landscape, Binyamin Gallery, Tel Aviv
 2014: Living Space, The Zaritsky Artists' House, Tel Aviv
 2013: Good Girls – Memory, Desire, Power, MNAC, National Museum for Contemporary Art, Bucharest, Romania
 2013: Becoming, Ha'midrasha Contemporary Art Gallery, Tel Aviv
 2013: No Ego, MusraraMix 13 Festival, Jerusalem
 2013: Labor in a Single Shot – Another Day, EPOS International Art Film Festival, Tel Aviv Museum of Art
 2012: Patterns of Behavior, Jerusalem Print Workshop (JPW), Jerusalem
 2012: Daily Reports, MNAC, National Museum for Contemporary Art, Bucharest, Romania
 2012: Teen Spirit, Grid 2012, International Photography Biennial, Amsterdam, Netherlands
 2011: New in Photography, The Israel Museum Jerusalem, Jerusalem 
 2011: Right Here, Right Now; Derby Museum and Art Gallery, UK
 2011: Where is There, The Rehovot Municipal Art Gallery
 2010: Safe Haven, The Genia Schreiber University Art Gallery, Tel Aviv 
 2010: Identity III: Positioning, WUK – FotogalerieWien, Vienna
 2010: Small is Beautiful & I already Said So, Vernon Gallery, Prague Contemporary Art Festival, Czech
 2009: Fotografie aus Israel, Kultur Bahnhof Eller Düsseldorf
 2009: Compact Duo, 10 Gallery, Beit Michal, Rehovot
 2008: Holga, Rayko Gallery, San Francisco
 2007: Jerusalem of One's Eye, The Social Gallery, Jerusalem
 2006: Bread, The Israel Museum, Jerusalem
 2005: Attitude 02, Magaza Museum, Macedonia
 2004: Disinformation My Love, The Israel Festival in Jerusalem

Installations and activities in the public realm 
 2014: Stations #1, Outdoors video screening at the plaza of The Suzanne Dellal Centre for Dance and Theatre, Tel Aviv
 2013: Videocracy, open screening in the CCA Tel Aviv public square, Israel
 2012: One Kilometer, #2 Haifa Walks, as a part of the exhibition HAIFA-JERUSALEM-TEL AVIV, Haifa Museum of Art
 2012: Green Kuku, a site specific installation, Contemporary Art Festival, #9 Testing Tools - In the Making, Tel Aviv
 2009: Oscar, protest installation, setting a 3 meters-high sculpture, Tel Aviv #1 International Art Biennial public square

Instruction and special projects 
 2013: Conductor of the project The Home – a book that interlaces Avot Yeshurun’s poems with selected contemporary artworks. Published by ‘Ha'kibbutz Hameuchad - Sifriat Poalim ’, Tel Aviv
 2011–12: Lecturer and curator in a two-year photography project, joint to students from Corcoran College of Art and Design, Washington D.C. USA and Musrara School of art, Jerusalem, Israel
 2011–12: Lecturer in “Place of Art Study - The Program for Active Artists”, Museum for Israeli Art, Ramat Gan, Israel
 2009–10: Guest Lecturer, Sapir Academic College, The School for Art, Society and Culture
 2009–10: Guest Lecturer, Tel Aviv University, Faculty of the Arts – The Yolanda & David Katz
 2007–10: Lecturer in special needs education project, The Naggar School of Photography in Musrara, Jerusalem

References

External links
/ Official Website
Artist Page at America-Israel Foundation
Works in BAAD Reservoir at Bezalel Academy of Arts and Design, Jerusalem
Artist Page at The Gottesman Etching Center, Kibbutz Cabri's Website

1961 births
Israeli contemporary artists
Israeli photographers
Israeli video artists
Israeli women artists
Living people